Isabelo "Jojo" Lastimosa Jr. (born March 10, 1964) is a Filipino former professional basketball player in the Philippine Basketball Association for the Purefoods Hotdogs, the Alaska Aces and the Pop Cola Panthers from 1988 to 2002. He is also both the head coach and team manager for the TNT Tropang Giga of the PBA. He was also a former member of the Philippines' national basketball team during the 1980s and 1990s. He also played for the University of San Jose - Recoletos in Cebu City. He had a stint also in Ateneo de Manila. He is known by the nicknames "Jolas", "Mr. Clutch", "The 4th Quarter Man", and "PBA Jordan" for his deadly perimeter shooting.

College and amateur career
Lastimosa was one of the eight rookies of the Blue Eagles basketball team of the Ateneo de Manila University in the UAAP 1981-82 season, After a two-stint with Ateneo, Lastimosa transferred to the University of San Jose–Recoletos in Cebu City. In June 1983, he joined elder brother Danny in the power-laden Mama's Love basketball club team. It was there where he got his biggest break and exposure, his reentry in the Manila basketball scene via the premier amateur league (PABL). In this league, he was able to showcase his skills in basketball.

In a short span of time, Lastimosa won MVP honors while playing for Mama's Love in the first conference of the 1985 PABL season. The following year, he became teammates with Samboy Lim and they led the Lhuillier Jewelers to the championship of the PABL's first conference. He spent his last two years in the amateur league with the Jewelers of coach Yayoy Alcoseba although he was a borrowed player when RFM-Swifts won their first PABL title in the 1987 International Invitational Cup and was voted Most Outstanding Player of the tournament, besting former national teammate Alvin Patrimonio.

PBA career
Lastimosa, along with Jerry Codiñera, were the two early entries to the pro league signed by newcomer Purefoods Hotdogs. He was already groomed to be a future superstar in the PBA. Jolas made such impact in his first season and was voted Rookie of the year. He won his first PBA title with the Hotdogs in the 1990 Third Conference but his best years were with the Alaska Milkmen, following a trade with Boy Cabahug beginning the 1991 PBA season. Lastimosa overall won 9 championships with Alaska, including a grandslam in 1996. In the twilight of his career, Jolas moved to Pop Cola in the 2000-2001 season before returning to his old club Alaska Aces in his final year in 2002.

Career highlights

PBA highlights
Member of the 1996 Alaska Grandslam Team
10-Time PBA Champion ( 1 With Purefoods, 9 with Alaska )
Rookie of the Year in 1988
3-time Mythical First Team Selection (1991, 1996 and 1998)
4-time Mythical Second Team Selection (1988, 1995, 1997 and 1999)
10-time PBA All-Star
1992 PBA All Star Game MVP
1996 All Filipino Cup Finals MVP
PBA 2,000 assist club Member
PBA 500 3-points club Member
PBA 12,000 points club Member
Member, PBA's 25 Greatest Players
Member, PBA's 40 Greatest Players

Other highlights
 Member, 1986 Asian Games (Bronze Medal)
 Member, 1987 William Jones Cup
 Member, 1998 PBA Centennial Team
 Member, 1998 William Jones Cup (Champions)
 Member, 1998 Asian Games (Bronze Medal)
 Member, PBL's Top 20 Players of All-Time

References

External links
 25 PBA Greatest players
 Philippine men's basketball
 21st Jones Cup men's basketball
 Manila Standard Sports

1964 births
Living people
Alaska Aces (PBA) players
Asian Games bronze medalists for the Philippines
Asian Games medalists in basketball
Basketball players at the 1986 Asian Games
Basketball players at the 1998 Asian Games
Basketball players from Misamis Oriental
Filipino men's basketball coaches
Magnolia Hotshots players
Philippine Basketball Association All-Stars
Philippine Basketball Association broadcasters
Alaska Aces (PBA) coaches
Philippine Basketball Association players with retired numbers
Philippines men's national basketball team players
Filipino men's basketball players
Pop Cola Panthers players
Shooting guards
Sportspeople from Cagayan de Oro
Ateneo Blue Eagles men's basketball players
USJ-R Jaguars basketball players
Medalists at the 1986 Asian Games
Medalists at the 1998 Asian Games
NLEX Road Warriors coaches
FEU Tamaraws basketball coaches
TNT Tropang Giga coaches